Runiz (also Romanized as Rūnīz; also known as Rownīz-e ‘Olyā, Rownīz-e Bālā, Rūnīz Bala, and Rūnīz-e Bālā, all meaning "Upper Runiz") is a city  and capital of Runiz District, in Estahban County, Fars Province, Iran.  At the 2006 census, its population was 5,991, in 1,466 families.

Notable people
Murzh Hasan -author (1767-1821)

References

Populated places in Estahban County

Cities in Fars Province